Il Selvaggio (Italian: the Savage or the Wild One) was an Italian language political and arts magazine that existed between 1924 and 1943. It was a media outlet of an intellectual group called Strapaese (Italian: Supervillage).

History and profile
Il Selvaggio was founded by Angelo Bencini and Mino Maccari, an Italian fascist artist and journalist, in Colle di Val d'Elsa in 1924 as a political magazine. The first issue of the bimonthly magazine was published on 13 July 1924. The founding director was Angiolo Bencini who held the post until 1926 when Mino Maccari succeeded him. The latter also edited the magazine. It featured articles which combined the topics of art, politics and humor.

The format of the magazine was 50x35 cm, but was changed to 44x32 cm. It had variable number of pages ranging from four to twelve pages. From 1926 Il Selvaggio was headquartered in Florence. The same year the Fascist government forced the magazine to contain cultural and satirical materials, making its goal to promote a version of an anti-intellectual version of arts. Then the magazine focused on the core of the Italian spirit observed "in the cradle of Italian civilization, namely the hills and countryside of Tuscany". In this period it came out weekly and acted as a representative of the Tuscan rural extremism.

The editorial offices of Il Selvaggio moved to Siena in 1929 and then to Turin in 1930. In 1932 its headquarters was moved to Rome. The frequency of the magazine was also frequently changed and was mostly published irregularly. Leo Longanesi, Ardengo Soffici, Carlo Carrà, Mario Tinti, Manlio Malabotta, Amerigo Bartoli Natinguerra, Giuseppe Pensabene and Ottone Rosai were among the leading contributors of the magazine. Over time Il Selvaggio focused on artistic subjects, including architectural topics, instead of political topics. The last issue of the magazine appeared in June 1943.

References

1924 establishments in Italy
1943 disestablishments in Italy
Bi-monthly magazines published in Italy
Defunct political magazines published in Italy
Fascist newspapers and magazines
Irregularly published magazines
Italian-language magazines
Magazines established in 1924
Magazines disestablished in 1943
Magazines published in Florence
Magazines published in Rome
Magazines published in Turin
Visual arts magazines
Satirical magazines published in Italy
Weekly magazines published in Italy